"That Kind of Beautiful" is a country music song written by Luke Laird, Hillary Lindsey and Gordie Sampson. It was recorded by the Canadian band Emerson Drive on their 2009 Believe. Sister Hazel released a version of the song in 2016 as part of their country album Lighter in the Dark.

Music video
The music video was directed by the band's fiddle player, David Pichette, and was released on June 13, 2010. It was filmed in March 2010 and features Pichette's daughter, lead singer Brad Mates' wife, and drummer Mike Melancon's wife.

Chart positions

References

2009 songs
2010 singles
Emerson Drive songs
Big Machine Records singles
Songs written by Hillary Lindsey
Songs written by Gordie Sampson
Songs written by Luke Laird
Song recordings produced by Josh Leo